David Nii Addy (born 21 February 1990) is a Ghanaian footballer.

Club career

Randers
In Summer 2008, Addy made his first international move to Europe, from a Ghanaian Club – International Allies FC being signed by Danish SAS Ligaen club Randers FC. At Randers FC, Addy made his debut on 19 October against Vejle gaining 7 minutes.

In the following season, Addy was part of the Randers FC squad that went to compete in the UEFA Europa League. He also made his debut in the UEFA Europa League, in the first qualifying round against Linfield FC from Northern Ireland on 2 July 2009.

Porto
On 1 February 2010 the Ghanaian U-20 champion joined Portuguese top club FC Porto from SAS Ligaen side Randers FC for €800,000, signing a 31⁄2 year contract.

The young Ghanaian U-20 made his debut for FC Porto on 14 April 2010 in a 4–0 Victory against Rio Ave FC.

Académica de Coimbra
In July 2010, he joined Académica de Coimbra on a season-long loan from Portuguese club FC Porto.

Panetolikos
On 31 August 2011, he joined a newly promoted Greek Superleague side Panetolikos F.C. on a season-long loan from Porto.

Vitoria S.C
On 30 September 2012, Addy signed a two-year deal for Vitoria S.C. In May 2013 Addy helped Vitoria S.C. win the 2012/13 Taca de Portugal and qualified for the 2013/14 UEFA Europa League. Addy had 4 successful UEFA Europa League appearances against Real Betis, Olympic Lyon and Rijeka. Vitoria S.C finished third in Group I and made an early exit from the competition.

Waasland-Beveren

In August 2014 Addy signed a 2-year deal with Belgian Pro League club Waasland-Beveren.

Addy has also had experience in the past few years playing in Asia and Scandinavia most recently helping Ilves to win the  domestic cup in Finland and also securing a Europa league place.

Riga
He terminated his contract with Riga FC in November 2017.

International career

Ghana U-20

Addy earned his first Black Satellites call-up after an impressive performance with the Local Black Stars in 2008, making his debut in January 2008 in a match against Angola.
In 2009 Addy was part of the squad that won the 2009 African Youth Championship. His success continued in October 2009 as he also took part in the 2009 FIFA U-20 World Cup held in Egypt which the team went on to win, making them the first African Nation to have ever won the 2009 FIFA U-20 World Cup.

Ghana

He was called up for the Black Stars for the game versus Lesotho on 8 June 2008. His second game was on 2 November 2008 against Niger. Addy has been called up to play for the Ghanaian Senior National Football team.

Personal life

In summer 2010, Addy got engaged to German-Ghanaian Economics graduate Gabriel. The couple first met in 2008 through a mutual friend. In May 2014 Addy and his wife celebrated the birth of their first child. The couple welcomed a bouncing baby girl in their lives born in Reading, Berkshire.

Career statistics

Club

1Includes other competitive competitions, including the Taça da Liga: 2010 and 2011.

International

Honours

Individual
Ghana Premier League Young Defender of the year 2008

Club

FC Porto
Taca de Portugal Cup winners with FC Porto

Vitória Guimarães
Portuguese Cup: 2012–13 Cup winners with Vitoria S.C.

Country
 African Youth Championship Champion: 2009
 FIFA U-20 World Cup Champion: 2009

References

External links
 
 
 10 Best Players at U-20 World Cup 2009 – Just-Football.com
 
 

1990 births
Living people
Ghanaian footballers
Ghana international footballers
Ghana under-20 international footballers
Ghanaian expatriate footballers
Primeira Liga players
Ghanaian expatriate sportspeople in Portugal
Expatriate footballers in Portugal
Ghanaian expatriate sportspeople in Denmark
Danish Superliga players
Expatriate men's footballers in Denmark
Ghanaian expatriate sportspeople in Greece
Super League Greece players
Expatriate footballers in Greece
Latvian Higher League players
People from Greater Accra Region
Association football fullbacks
Expatriate footballers in Estonia
Meistriliiga players
S.C. Adelaide players
International Allies F.C. players
Legon Cities FC players
Randers FC players
FC Porto players
Associação Académica de Coimbra – O.A.F. players
Panetolikos F.C. players
Vitória S.C. players
S.K. Beveren players
Odisha FC players
Rovaniemen Palloseura players
Riga FC players
Ilves players
Tartu JK Tammeka players
Ghanaian expatriate sportspeople in Estonia